Jardine's Bazaar is a road located in Causeway Bay, Hong Kong. The road was named after William Jardine, when Jardine Matheson acquired the land in the area. The road ends at the junction of Hennessy Road, Yee Wo Street, Jardine's Crescent and Lockhart Road. Many shops are located along the road.

It is one of the oldest shopping areas in Hong Kong dating back at least to 1845.

See also
 List of streets and roads in Hong Kong

References

External links
 

Causeway Bay
Roads on Hong Kong Island